Superior Speed is the debut studio album by South Korea boy group Speed. The album marks the first release without members Kanghaeng and Noori, and the group's official sub-unit debut. The album and repackage was preceded by promotional singles  "It's Over" and "Pain, the Love of Heart"

Release
On December 9, 2012, Core Contents Media released the first teaser photo for "It's Over". Before the release of the album, Speed's they released digital single "Speed of Light" featuring 슬플약속 (That's My Fault). The album followed a few days later.

A total of 5 music videos were released to promote the album; Two music videos were released for the song "Sad Promise" featuring Davichi's Kang Min-kyung; a dance version, and a drama version featuring Park Bo-young, A Pink's Naeun, Ji Chang-wook and Ha Seok-jin. Two music videos for official title track "It's Over" featuring Park Bo-young were released; another dance version and a Drama Version serving as a continuation to the Sad Promise Drama video, and a music video for repackage single "Pain, the Love of Heart".

Track listing

Charts

Album charts

Single charts

Superior Speed
슬픈약속 (That's My Fault)

Blow speed
통증 (Pain the Love of Heart)

Release history

References

2013 albums
Kakao M albums